Phillip Emery Freeman (born December 9, 1962) is a former professional American football wide receiver in the National Football League. He played three seasons for the Tampa Bay Buccaneers (1985–1987). During his time with the Buccaneers, Freeman kick returned for 1667 yards, making him one of the top kick returners in Tampa Bay Buccaneers history.

References

1962 births
Living people
Players of American football from Saint Paul, Minnesota
American football wide receivers
Arizona Wildcats football players
Tampa Bay Buccaneers players